Edward Hemsted (10 October 1846 – 12 March 1884) was an English first-class cricketer. He was a right-handed batsman who bowled right-arm roundarm fast and made his first-class debut for the Gentlemen of Kent against the Gentlemen of Marylebone Cricket Club in 1863.

Hemsted made his Hampshire debut 1866, against the Marylebone Cricket Club. During the 1866 season, Hemsted claimed his maiden and only five wicket haul against Surrey, taking figures of 5/14. Hemsted played eight first-class matches for Hampshire, with his final match coming against the Marylebone Cricket Club in 1869.

In his eight games for Hampshire, Hemsted scored 220 runs at an average of 15.71, with a top score of 39. With the ball Hemsted took ten wickets at a bowling average of 13.90.

Hemsted died at Weymouth, Dorset on 12 March 1884.

External links
Edward Hemsted at Cricinfo
Edward Hemsted at CricketArchive

1846 births
1884 deaths
People from Whitchurch, Hampshire
English cricketers
Hampshire cricketers
Gentlemen of Kent cricketers